is a Kofun period keyhole-shaped burial mound, located in the Mayu neighborhood of the city of Kishiwada, Osaka in the Kansai region of Japan. The tumulus was designated a National Historic Site of Japan in 1956, with the area under protection expanded in 2010.

Overview
It is located on a hill overlooking the Ushitaki River, which flows out of the Izumi Mountains. It is orientated to the northwest, and has a length about 200 meters with a posterior rear circle diameter of about 130 meters, making it the largest in the Izumi region. The tumulus was originally covered in fukiishi  and had a large number and variety of haniwa, including cylindrical, and "morning glory-shaped" variants. There were also a ceremonial platforms extending on both sides off of the constriction between the posterior and anterior portions. Traces of a moat remain around the posterior circular portion, but it is not certain if this moat was contemporary with the building of the tumulus, or was a later addition. Archaeological excavations have only been conducted around the periphery of the tumulus 1997 and 1998, and a full-scale survey has never been conducted, Consequently, details of the burial chamber are uncertain, but is it believed to have been a vertical pit-type structure which was robbed in antiquity judging from scattered fragments of schist and shards of Haji ware pottery which have been found on the surface of the posterior circular portion. From the construction details, haniwa, and pottery shards, it is estimated that the tumulus was built around the latter half of the 4th century. At present, access to the tumulus area is restricted.

In the vicinity of the Mayuyama Kofun are a number of ancillary tumuli. The Makozuka Kofun is a square-type measuring 35 meters on each side. It was largely flattened in 1958 during work to repair the moat embankment on the Mayuyama Kofun, during which time cylindrical haniwa were excavated. It  estimated to have been built in the latter half of the 4th century (or the beginning of the 5th century).

The tumulus is about a twelve minutes by car from Kumeda Station on the JR West Hanwa Line.

Total length 200 meters:
Anterior rectangular portion 95 meters wide x 8 meters high, 3-tier
Posterior circular portion 127 meter diameter x 15 meters high, 3-tiers

See also
List of Historic Sites of Japan (Osaka)

References

External links

Kishiwada City home page

History of Osaka Prefecture
Kishiwada, Osaka
Historic Sites of Japan
Archaeological sites in Japan
Kofun